Monsieur Hector is a 1940 French musical comedy film based upon the play by Pierre de Marivaux, directed by Maurice Cammage and starring Fernandel, Denise Grey and Georges Grey. It was shot at the Neuilly Studios in Paris. The film's sets were designed by the art director Marcel Magniez.

Synopsis
An aristocrat and his valet, after disappointments in life, decide to switch clothes and positions during the Nice Carnival.

Cast
 Fernandel as Hector  
 Denise Grey as Maroussia de Dragomir  
 Georges Grey as Le vicomte de Saint-Amand  
 Gaby Wagner as Jacqueline Monturot  
 Raymond Rognoni as Monturot  
 Madeleine Suffel as Suzanne  
 Marthe Mussine as La femme de chambre  
 Alice Deneige as La chanteuse 
 Rivers Cadet as Le maître d'hôtel  
 Marfa d'Hervilly as Une vieille cliente  
 Pierre Ferval 
 Suzanne Fleurant as Une cliente  
 Édouard Francomme 
 Jacques Henley as Un client  
 Philippe Richard as Le gérant 
 Jean-Jacques Steen 
 Jean Témerson as Le Baron Grondin  
 Eugène Yvernès 
 Georges Guétary as Danseur tyrolien

References

Bibliography 
 Quinlan, David. Quinlan's Film Stars. Batsford, 2000.

External links 
 

1940 films
1940 musical comedy films
1940s French-language films
Films directed by Maurice Cammage
Films scored by Casimir Oberfeld
French musical comedy films
French black-and-white films
Films shot at Neuilly Studios
Tobis Film films
Films set in Nice
1940s French films